Schilbe moebiusii is a species of schilbid catfish endemic to Tanzania where it occurs in the Ruaha, Kingani and Kilombero Rivers.  This species grows to a length of  TL.

References

Sources
 

Schilbe
Freshwater fish of Tanzania
Endemic fauna of Tanzania
Fish described in 1896
Taxonomy articles created by Polbot
Taxa named by Georg Johann Pfeffer